Liopeltis is a genus of colubrid snakes. With species known from India and Southeast Asia.

Species 
 L. calamaria
 L. frenatus
 L. pallidonuchalis
 L. philippinus  is, as the name suggests, a native of the Philippines
 L. rappi
 L. stoliczkae
 L. tiomanica
 L. tricolor (or Malayan ringneck) is the most widely distributed species in the genus, being found in Indonesia, Brunei, Malaysia, the Philippines, Singapore, Thailand, and Vietnam.

Geographic range 

India and Southeast Asia.

References

 
Snake genera
Taxa named by Leopold Fitzinger